Stipa pulcherrima, golden feather grass is a bisexual flowering plant in the family Poaceae.

Description
Its leaf-blades are erect, conduplicated, and sometimes ascend. The panicles are smooth and contracted. Compressed spikelets have only 1 floret which doesn't have rhachilla extension. It glumes are similar to the fertile spikelet.

References

pulcherrima